Telefon Tel Aviv is a New Orleans–derived, Chicago-based American electronic music act, formerly comprising Charles Cooper and Joshua Eustis. Since Cooper's accidental death in 2009, Telefon Tel Aviv has continued with Eustis as the sole official member. Eustis was also a touring member of Puscifer and Nine Inch Nails for a time.

History
Telefon Tel Aviv was formed in 1999 by Charles Cooper and Joshua Eustis, with their first album Fahrenheit Fair Enough, released in the fall of 2001 to positive reviews. In 2002, the group released an EP on the Hefty Records Immediate Action label. In 2004, the duo released their second full-length album, Map of What Is Effortless, and a compilation album of remixes titled Remixes Compiled in 2007. The group released its third full-length album in January 2009 on the BPitch Control label. Influenced by English electronic band Orchestral Manoeuvres in the Dark (OMD), Immolate Yourself peaked at #17 on the Billboard Top Electronic Albums chart. In 2016, their debut was re-released with eight bonus tracks.

Since 2011, Eustis has been working on new music. In March 2012, Eustis mentioned on his Twitter account that he was "trying" to work on new Telefon Tel Aviv material. In February 2013, Eustis was announced as a member of the touring lineup of Nine Inch Nails. He was originally slated to tour with band throughout 2013 and 2014. However, on December 5, 2013, it was revealed by Trent Reznor that Eustis was no longer part of the Nine Inch Nails touring line-up, citing only Alessandro Cortini, Ilan Rubin, Robin Finck, and himself as band members during an IAmA on Reddit. Eustis also confirmed this on the official Telefon Tel Aviv website.

Death of Charles Cooper
On January 22, 2009, Eustis announced on the group's MySpace blog that Charles Cooper had died. The information also appeared on the band's website: "Charles Wesley Cooper III / April 12, 1977 - January 22, 2009".  Two CBS2 Chicago articles about Cooper's death specify that he went missing on January 21 before being found dead.

On January 30, 2009, Eustis posted on the group's MySpace blog that all tour plans have been cancelled and the future of the band is uncertain.

On March 22, 2009, Eustis posted on the group's MySpace blog that he will perform on stage with a close friend of the group, Fredo Nogueira.

On July 22, 2009, Eustis posted on the group's MySpace in order to clarify some rumours about Cooper's death, stating that three autopsy reports ruled it was not a suicide but possibly an accidental mix of sleeping pills and alcohol.

Sons Of Magdalene and Future
On December 9, 2013, Josh Eustis posted on the official Telefon Tel Aviv website that he was going back into the studio full-time, as he was no longer a touring member of Nine Inch Nails and presumably Puscifer as well. In the same post, Eustis stated that he has been sitting on a 95% finished full-length album under the moniker of Sons Of Magdalene, a name previously used for an EP released in 2008. Additionally, the post confirmed that after the record was finished, he would be working on Telefon Tel Aviv full-time. The debut album from the Sons of Magdelene moniker, Move to Pain, was released June 24 2014.

Production

In interviews, Cooper and Eustis have stated that they use the following software: Digidesign Pro Tools, Native Instruments Reaktor/Electronic Instruments 2 XT, Ableton Live and Max/MSP

Additionally, the band has contributed samples to the Native Instruments Synthetic Drums 2 sample library.

For the album Immolate Yourself the band drastically changed their production style, reverting to analog tape and analog synthesizers, claiming this method to "sound more real".

Discography

Studio albums
 2001: Fahrenheit Fair Enough
 2004: Map of What Is Effortless
 2009: Immolate Yourself (#17 Billboard Top Electronic Albums)
 2019: Dreams Are Not Enough (#2 Billboard Top Electronic Albums)

Extended plays
 2002: Immediate Action

Compilations
 2007: Remixes Compiled

Remixes and Collaborations
 2000: John Hughes - "Got Me Lost / Driving In LA" (Immediate Action#6)
 2000: Nine Inch Nails - "Where Is Everybody?" (Things Falling Apart)
 2001: Phil Ranelin - "Time Is Running Out" (Remixes)
 2003: Midwest Product - "A Genuine Display" (Idol Tryouts : Ghostly International Vol. 1)
 2004: Slicker - "Knock Me Down Girl" (Knock Me Down Girl)
 2005: Marc Hellner - "Asleep On The Wing" (Asleep On The Wing)
 2005: Apparat - "Komponent" (Silizium EP)
 2005: Oliver Nelson - "Stolen Moments" (Impulsive! Revolutionary Jazz Reworked)
 2005: Bebel Gilberto - "All Around" (Bebel Gilberto Remixed)
 2005: AmmonContact - "BBQ Plate" (Microsolutions To Megaproblems)
 2005: Nitrada - "Fading Away" (Four Remixes)
 2007: 刀郎 - "艾里甫與賽乃姆" (Dancing With Dao Lang (與刀郎共舞))
 2008: Apparat - "Arcadia" (Arcadia Rmxs)
 2008: Genghis Tron – "Relief" (Board Up The House Remixes Volume 4)
 2008: Barbara Morgenstern - "Come To Berlin" (Come To Berlin Mixes)
 2009: Art Of Trance - "Swarm" (Swarm)
 2011: SONOIO - "Can You Hear Me?" (NON SONOIO - Red Remixes)
 2012: Cubenx – "Grass" (Grass Remixes)
 2013: Dillon and Telefon Tel Aviv - "Feel the Fall" (Where the Wind Blows)
 2015: Lusine - "Arterial" (Arterial Reworks)
 2016: Vatican Shadow & Telefon Tel Aviv - "Rejoice" (Compilation by #savefabric)
 2017: These Hidden Hands - "Glasir" (Vicarious Memories Remixed)
 2018: Belief Defect - "Deliverance" (Remixed 01)
 2019: Shlømo - "Hadal Skin" (Mercurial Skin Remixes: Tome 2)
 2020: Bochum Welt - "Color Me" (Seafire Remixes)
 2021: Modeselektor - "Mean Friend" (Telefon Tel Aviv Remix)
 2021: Deftones - "Digital Bath" (RSD 12")
 2022: Stimming - "Judith Maria" (Telefon Tel Aviv Remix)
 2023: Sheena Ringo - "Gate of Hades"

Appearances (Eustis)
 2004: A Perfect Circle - eMOTIVe
 2011: Puscifer - Conditions of My Parole
 2012: Puscifer - Donkey Punch the Night
 2013: Puscifer - All Re-Mixed Up
 2013: Nine Inch Nails - Hesitation Marks
 2016: The Black Queen - Fever Daydream
 2016: Second Woman - Second Woman
2018: The Black Queen - Infinite Games

Under "Sons of Magdalene" moniker 
 2008: Ephemera
 2014: Move to Pain
 2015: Ecumenicals

References

External links

 Official website
 Interview at Ableton's Web site

Ableton Live users
Electronic music groups from Illinois
Intelligent dance musicians
Musical groups established in 1999
American ambient music groups
American techno music groups
American industrial music groups
1999 establishments in the United States